Jason Terrell Hunter (born August 28, 1983) is a former American football defensive end. He was signed by the Green Bay Packers as an undrafted free agent in 2006. He played college football at Appalachian State.

Hunter has also played for the Detroit Lions and Denver Broncos.

College career
During his college tenure at Appalachian State University in Boone, North Carolina, he was instrumental in his team's achieving the NCAA I-AA National Football Championship in 2005 a year in which he was named an All-Conference and Second-team All-American honoree. As a senior, Hunter had 101 tackles (51 solo) 24.5 tackles for loss and 13 sacks in 15 starts.  He also had three defensive touchdowns, two off of fumbles and one off an interception. In 2004, he finished with 31 tackles (14 solo), including two stops for loss and 1.5 sacks, in 11 games. In 2003, he played in 12 games, collecting 30 tackles (23 solo), including four stops for loss and 3.5 sacks, and four passes defensed. He had 25 tackles (22 solo), including eight stops for loss and six sacks, three forced fumbles and two fumble recoveries in 12 games as a true freshman in 2002. In 50 games (15 starts) over four years at Appalachian State, concluded career  with 186 tackles (110 solo), 38.5 stops for loss, 24 sacks, nine passes defensed, five forced fumbles, five fumble recoveries and one interception.

Professional career

Pre-draft
Hunter at 6-4, 260 pounds ran a 4.88 second 40-yard dash.

Green Bay Packers
Jason Hunter was signed by the Green Bay Packers as an undrafted rookie free agent in 2006, he earned a roster spot in 2006 training camp and played in 14 games as a rookie. He saw limited play on defense in seven contests and recorded a pair of solo tackles He had also had eight special teams tackles and registered the Packers’ lone 2006 onside kick recovery. In the 2007 season Hunter was a key to the Packers special teams unit, acquiring 15 tackles and a forced fumble. In week 11 of the 2008 season Hunter returned a fumble 55 yards for a touchdown against the Chicago Bears. Hunter became a restricted Free Agent after the season but was re signed by the Packers on March 16, 2009. However, the Packers waived him on May 4.

Detroit Lions
Hunter was signed by the Detroit Lions on May 6, 2009. After one season with Detroit, Hunter was released on August 16, 2010.

Denver Broncos
Hunter signed with the Denver Broncos on August 20, 2010.  Following his signing he was informed by the team that he would be playing a new position. He was moved to linebacker from defensive end. "They said I'm going to be a linebacker here. I've never played 'backer in my life, so this is going to be a huge challenge for me," Hunter said. "I'm going to have to work hard every day and challenge myself."

During the 2011 Season, Jason was placed back into the Defensive End position under the new system of John Fox. He was replacing Elvis Dumervil while Dumervil was injured.

Oakland Raiders
Hunter signed with the Oakland Raiders on March 13, 2013.  At the end of the NFL 2013 season Jason Hunter became a free agent.

Personal life

Stabbing
On April 27, 2011, Detroit police said that Hunter had been stabbed and taken to a local hospital. Officer Dan Donakowski said that Hunter had been stabbed that Wednesday, but police didn’t have any additional information (including where the incident took place, who was responsible and Hunter’s condition). The hospital wasn’t disclosed. The Broncos released a statement saying the team hoped Hunter would “make[s] a quick recovery,” but that out of respect for his privacy, it wouldn’t comment further.

References

1983 births
Living people
American football defensive ends
American football linebackers
Appalachian State Mountaineers football players
Denver Broncos players
Detroit Lions players
Green Bay Packers players
Oakland Raiders players
Sportspeople from Fayetteville, North Carolina
Players of American football from Charlotte, North Carolina